Generals elections were held in Spain on 10 October 1967 where Spanish citizens elected 102 of the 564 members of the Cortes Españolas, the Spanish legislature. It was the first election held in Spain since the 1936 general election before the Spanish Civil War (1936–1939) and the first election held during the dictatorship of Francisco Franco.

Electoral procedure 

To be eligible to vote, citizens must be heads of families, married women, or widows. To be eligible to be a candidate, citizens must be born in a province they are running in, have resided in the province for at least seven years since the age of 14, be supported by 1,000 electors of 0.5 percent of the province's population, and be a member of the National Movement.

Two members were elected from each province, including from Fernando Poo, Río Muni, and Spanish Sahara; Ceuta and Melilla elected one member. The remaining seats were appointed by the Spanish government.

Results

References 

1967 in Spain
General elections in Spain
October 1967 events